Plas Llanfair is an area in the  community of Llanfair Pwllgwyngyll, Ynys Môn, Wales, which is 127.6 miles (205.4 km) from Cardiff and 208.5 miles (335.5 km) from London.

References

See also
List of localities in Wales by population

Villages in Anglesey